Livin' Lozada is an American reality television series starring Evelyn Lozada and her daughter, Shaniece Hairston. It premiered on July 11, 2015, on the Oprah Winfrey Network, as part of its Saturday-night reality lineup.

Episodes

Season 1 (2015)

Season 2 (2016)

References

2010s American reality television series
2015 American television series debuts
English-language television shows
Oprah Winfrey Network original programming
2016 American television series endings